Michele Mathews Leber (July 30, 1938 – ) was a journalist, book reviewer, and librarian.

Early life 
Michele Leber was born on July 30, 1938, in Appleton, Wisconsin. She graduated from Northwestern University.

Career 
She was a journalist for The Post-Crescent. She was a librarian for Fairfax County, Virginia. She was on the book buying committee, and reviewed books for The Library Journal.

Personal life 
She married Ted Leber. Michele Leber died on January 1, 2021, at her home in Arlington, Virginia.

References

External links

 OBITUARY Michele Mathews Leber

Created via preloaddraft
1938 births
2021 deaths
American librarians
Northwestern University alumni
People from Appleton, Wisconsin